The 1933 Pittsburgh Pirates was the debut season of the team that eventually became the Pittsburgh Steelers. The team was founded after Pennsylvania relaxed its blue laws that, prior to 1933, prohibited sporting events from taking place on Sundays, when most NFL games took place. The new squad was composed largely of local semi-pro players, many of whom played for sports promoter Art Rooney. Rooney became the Pirates owner, paying the NFL a $2,500 fee to join the league. Except for a brief period in 1940 and '41, Rooney would remain the franchise's principal owner until his death in 1988. The Rooney family has retained a controlling interest ever since.
The team took the field for the first time on September 20 against the New York Giants at Forbes Field, losing 23–2. The following week, the team got its first win, defeating the Chicago Cardinals at home 14–13.

The team finished 3–6–2 for the season.

Regular season

Schedule

Standings

Game summaries

Week 1 (Wednesday September 20, 1933): New York Giants 

at Forbes Field, Pittsburgh, Pennsylvania

 Game time: 
 Game weather: 
 Game attendance: 20,000
 Referee: 
 TV announcers:

Scoring drives:

 New York – Strong 33 interception (Strong kick)
 Pittsburgh – Safety, Strong punt blocked out of end zone by Oehler
 New York – Newman 5 run (Strong kick)
 New York – FG Newman 39
 New York – Burnett 37 pass from Newman (kick failed)

Week 2 (Wednesday September 27, 1933): Chicago Cardinals  

at Forbes Field, Pittsburgh, Pennsylvania

 Game time: 
 Game weather: 
 Game attendance: 5,000
 Referee: 
 TV announcers:

Scoring drives:

 Chicago Cardinals – McNally 51 intercepted lateral (kick failed)
 Chicago Cardinals – Moe 35 pass from Lillard (Lillard kick)
 Pittsburgh – Kottler 99 interception (Kelsch kick)
 Pittsburgh – Moss 11 pass from Tanguay (Kelsch kick)

Week 3 (Wednesday October 4, 1933): Boston Redskins  

at Forbes Field, Pittsburgh, Pennsylvania

 Game time: 
 Game weather: 
 Game attendance: 15,000
 Referee: 
 TV announcers:

Scoring drives:

 Boston – Battles 70 punt return (Musick kick)
 Boston – Musick 1 run (Musick kick)
 Boston – Holmer 1 run (LaPresta kick)
 Pittsburgh – Brovelli 1 run (kick failed)

Week 4 (Wednesday October 11, 1933): Cincinnati Reds  

at Forbes Field, Pittsburgh, Pennsylvania

 Game time: 
 Game weather: 
 Game attendance: 5,000
 Referee: 
 TV announcers:

Scoring drives:

 Cincinnati – FG Clark 12
 Pittsburgh – Westfall 2 run (Brovelli kick)
 Pittsburgh – FG Kelsch 36
 Pittsburgh – Vaughan 3 run (Westfall kick)

Week 5 (Sunday October 15, 1933): at Green Bay Packers  

City Stadium, Green Bay, Wisconsin

 Game time: 
 Game weather: 
 Game attendance: 4,000
 Referee: 
 TV announcers:

Scoring drives:

 Green Bay – Hinkle 1 run (Monnett kick)
 Green Bay – Monnett 7 run (kick failed)
 Green Bay – Goldenberg 67 interception (Grove kick)
 Green Bay – Goldenberg 3 run (Monnett kick)
 Green Bay – Bruder 52 run (Herber kick)
 Green Bay – Monnett 12 run (kick failed)
 Green Bay – Englemann 40 lateral from Monnett after 9 pass from Herber (Monnett kick)

Week 6 (Sunday October 22, 1933): at Cincinnati Reds  

at Redland Field, Cincinnati

 Game time: 
 Game weather: 
 Game attendance: 
 Referee: 
 TV announcers:

Scoring drives:

 none

Week 7 (Sunday October 29, 1933): at Boston Redskins  

at Fenway Park, Boston, Massachusetts

 Game time: 
 Game weather: 
 Game attendance: 7,500
 Referee: 
 TV announcers:

Scoring drives:

 Boston – Battles 5 run (Musick kick)
 Pittsburgh – Moss 30 pass from Holm (kick failed)
 Pittsburgh – FG Engebretsen 21
 Pittsburgh – Westfall 60 pass from Holm (Brovelli kick)
 Boston – Weller run (Musick kick)

Week 8 (Sunday November 5, 1933): at Brooklyn Dodgers  

at Ebbets Field, Brooklyn, New York

 Game time: 
 Game weather: 
 Game attendance: 15,000
 Referee: 
 TV announcers:

Scoring drives:

 Brooklyn – FG Hickman 30
 Pittsburgh – FG Kelsch 15

Week 9 (Sunday November 12, 1933): Brooklyn Dodgers  

at Forbes Field, Pittsburgh, Pennsylvania

 Game time: 
 Game weather: 
 Game attendance: 12,000
 Referee: 
 TV announcers:

Scoring drives:

 Brooklyn – Kelly 15 run (kick failed)
 Brooklyn – Kelly 70 punt return (Hickman kick)
 Brooklyn – Nash 61 pass from Cagle (kick failed)
 Brooklyn – Kelly 2 run (Kelly kick)
 Brooklyn – Fishel 7 run (kick failed)

Week 10 (Sunday November 19, 1933): at Philadelphia Eagles  

at Baker Bowl, Philadelphia

 Game time: 
 Game weather: 
 Game attendance: 6,000
 Referee: 
 TV announcers:

Scoring drives:

 Philadelphia – Hanson run (kick failed)
 Philadelphia – Carter pass from Kirkman (Kirkman kick)
 Philadelphia – Carter pass from Kirkman (kick failed)
 Pittsburgh – Brovelli run (kick failed)
 Philadelphia – Woodruff run (kick failed)

Week 12 (Sunday December 3, 1933): at New York Giants  

at Polo Grounds, New York City

 Game time: 
 Game weather: 
 Game attendance: 10,000
 Referee: 
 TV announcers:

Scoring drives:

 Pittsburgh – FG Kelsch 14
 New York – Krause 20 pass from Strong (Strong kick)
 New York – Badgro 25 pass from Newman (kick failed)
 New York – Richards 14 pass from Newman (Richards kick)
 New York – Richards 22 run (Krause pass from Newman)

References

Pittsburgh Steelers seasons
Pittsburgh
Pittsburg Pir